Budesonide/formoterol, sold under the brand name Symbicort among others, is a fixed-dose combination medication used in the management of asthma or chronic obstructive pulmonary disease (COPD). It contains budesonide, a steroid and formoterol, a long-acting β2-agonist (LABA). The product monograph does not support its use for sudden worsening or treatment of active bronchospasm. However, a 2020 review of the literature does support such use. It is used by breathing in the medication.

Common (≥1/100 to <1/10) side effects include candidiasis, headache, tremor, palpitations, throat irritation, coughing, and dysphonia. Pneumonia is a common side effect in people with COPD, and other, less common side effects have been documented. There were concerns that the LABA component increases the risk of death in children with asthma, however these concerns were removed in 2017. Therefore, this combination is only recommended in those who are not controlled on an inhaled steroid alone. There is tentative evidence that typical doses of inhaled steroids and LABAs are safe in pregnancy. Both formoterol and budesonide are excreted in breast-milk.

Budesonide/formoterol was approved for medical use in the United States in 2006. It is on the World Health Organization's List of Essential Medicines.  It is available as a generic medication. In 2020, it was the 61st most commonly prescribed medication in the United States, with more than 11million prescriptions.

Medical uses

Maintenance
Budesonide/formoterol has shown efficacy to prevent asthma attacks. It is unclear if the efficacy of budesonide/formoterol differs from that of fluticasone and salmeterol in chronic asthma.

Exacerbation
The combination is approved in the United States only as a maintenance medication in asthma and chronic obstructive pulmonary disease (COPD). However, a 2020 review of the literature does support use as needed during acute worsening in those with mild disease, and as maintenance followed by extra doses during worsening.

Use for both maintenance and as-needed treatment is also known as single maintenance and reliever therapy (SMART) and is a well-established treatment. It has been shown to, 1) reduce asthma exacerbations that require oral corticosteroids, 2) reduce hospital visits better than maintenance on inhaled corticosteroids alone at a higher dose, or 3) inhaled corticosteroid at the same or higher dose together with a long-acting bronchodilator (LABA), with a short-acting bronchodilator (SABA) as a reliever.

Side effects

Common (up to 1 in 10 people)
Mild throat irritation
Coughing
Hoarseness
Oral candidiasis (thrush. significantly less likely if the patient rinses their mouth out with water after inhalations)
Headache

Often mild, and usually disappear as the medication continues to be used:

 Heart palpitations
 Trembling

Uncommon (up to 1 in 100 people)

Feeling restlessness, nervous, or agitated
Disturbed sleep
Feeling dizzy
Nausea
Tachycardia (fast heart rate)
Bruising of the skin
Muscle cramps

Rare (up to 1 in 1,000 people)

Rash
Itchiness
Bronchospasm (tightening of the muscles in the airways causing wheezing immediately after use of the medication, which is possibly sign of an allergic reaction and should be met with immediate medical attention)
Hypokalemia (low levels of potassium in the blood)
Heart arrhythmia

Very rare (up to 1 in 10,000 people)

Depression
Changes in behaviour, especially in children
Chest pain or tightness in chest
Increase in blood glucose levels
Taste changes, such as an unpleasant taste in the mouth
Changes in blood pressure

Other
With high doses for a long period of time.

 Reduced bone mineral density, causing osteoporosis
 Cataracts
 Glaucoma
 Slowed rate of growth in children and adolescents
 Dysfunction of the adrenal gland, which affects the production of various hormones

Allergic reaction 

 Angioedema (swelling of the face, mouth, tongue, and/or throat. Difficulty swallowing. Hives. Difficulty breathing. Feeling of faintness)
 Bronchospasm (sudden acute wheezing or shortness of breath immediately after use of medication. The patient should use their reliever medication immediately.)

Society and culture

Legal status
It was approved for use in the United States in July 2006.

Budesonide/formoterol was approved for use in the European Union in April 2014.

There are several patents related to the drug; some of which have expired. It was initially marketed by AstraZeneca.

References

External links 
 
 
 

Combination drugs
Respiratory agents
AstraZeneca brands
World Health Organization essential medicines
Wikipedia medicine articles ready to translate